The Discworld Companion is an encyclopaedia of the Discworld fictional universe, created by Terry Pratchett and Stephen Briggs. Four editions have been published, under varying titles.

The Companion contains precise definitions of words, people, places and events that have appeared in at least one Discworld novel, map, diary or non-fiction book, or in one of the three short stories "Troll Bridge", "Theatre of Cruelty", and "The Sea and Little Fishes". Material is often quoted directly from these sources, but, in each successive edition, also includes information that had not yet been worked into the novels. For instance, William de Worde is mentioned in the first edition of the Companion six years before the publication of The Truth, the novel in which he is introduced. At the end of each article is an abbreviation indicating the book(s) in which the word, person, event or place appears, though if there are too many, no abbreviation is used. The book includes an introduction by Stephen Briggs and an interview with Terry Pratchett, both of which have been updated in each edition.

The first edition, published in 1994, contained information from all the novels up to Soul Music as well as the first two short stories. The second edition, published in 1997, added information up to Maskerade. The third edition was published in 2003 under the title The New Discworld Companion. It contains articles based on books up to Night Watch, as well as related books and short stories. The book also contains a ten-page interview with Pratchett under the heading "Discworld Quo Vadis?".

An updated edition of the Companion, published on 18 October 2012, was called Turtle Recall: The Discworld Companion ... So Far and included information from all the novels up to and including Snuff.

In March 2021 a new edition, rumoured to be titled "The Absolute Discworld Companion", was listed for pre-order at several book stores; this was later confirmed as The Ultimate Discworld Companion, which is to be published on 11 November 2021 and is updated to include information from all forty-one Discworld novels. On 16 September 2021, Dunmanifestin Ltd announced a deluxe hardcover "Dunmanifestin Edition" to be published on 23 April 2022 which also includes additional information drawn from The Science of Discworld books.

Publication history
  Hardcover
  trade paperback
  Paperback
  Paperback, US edition
  Trade paperback, 544 pp.
  Trade paperback, 280 pp. Omits "Where Am I?"
  Paperback, 472 pp.
  Hardcover
  Hardcover, US edition, 464 pp.
  Hardcover, UK edition, 448 pp.
  Trade Paperback, UK edition, 448 pp.

References
Notes

Bibliography

 Clute, John and John Grant. The Encyclopedia of Fantasy. New York: St Martin's Press, 1997.  / London: Orbit Books, 1997. .

External links
 Discworld & Pratchett Wiki
 

Encyclopedias of fictional worlds
Discworld books
Victor Gollancz Ltd books
1994 books